Boris Vadimovich Berezovsky (born 4 January 1969) is a Russian pianist.

Biography 
Berezovsky's original name was Elyashberg, Boris Vadimovich. His parents changed the last name to Berezovsky when he was seven years old. He studied at the Moscow Conservatory with Eliso Virsaladze and privately with Alexander Satz. Following his London début at the Wigmore Hall in 1988, The Times described him as "an artist of exceptional promise, a player of dazzling virtuosity and formidable power." In 1990, he won First Prize at the International Tchaikovsky Competition.

In May 2005, he had his first solo recital in Théâtre des Champs-Élysées in Paris and played in the same venue in January 2006 with the Orchestre National de France. In January 2007, he played seven recitals "Carte Blanche" in the Louvre.
In May 2009, he premiered Karol Beffa's "Piano concerto" in Toulouse, with Orchestre National du Capitole de Toulouse and Tugan Sokhiev as conductor.

Career 
Berezovsky has initiated and organized the International Medtner Festival that took place 2006 and 2007 in Moscow, Yekaterinburg and Vladimir.

Recordings

Berezovsky's has made recordings of the complete Beethoven Piano concertos with the Swedish Chamber Orchestra with Thomas Dausgaard. He has made records for Teldec, including solo discs of works by Chopin, Schumann, Rachmaninoff, Mussorgsky, Balakirev, Medtner, Ravel and the complete Liszt Transcendental Etudes.

With the Mirare Label, he has recorded the Rachmaninoff Préludes (May 2005) as well as that composer's complete Piano Concertos with the Ural Philharmonic Orchestra conducted by Dmitri Liss (August 2005). His album Tchaikovsky Piano Concerto No. 1 and Khachaturian Piano Сoncerto (Ural Philharmonic Orchestra/Dmitry Liss) was released in April 2006 in the UK.

The most recent recordings are Medtner Tales & Poems with Yana Ivanilova (soprano), Vassily Savenko (baritone) (Mirare 2008), Medtner Two pieces for two pianos, Op. 58, with Hamish Milne (piano) in: Medtner Complete Piano Sonatas; Piano Works — Vol. 7 (Brilliant Classics 2008), Rachmaninoff Suite No. 1 for two pianos, Op. 5 & Suite No. 2 for two pianos, Op. 17, with Brigitte Engerer (piano) (Mirare 2008). In 2010 Berezovsky released a record of his Liszt recital (Mirare 2008). His recording of selected works by Brahms (Piano Concerto No. 2, Variations on a Theme of Paganini, and Hungarian Dances Nos. 1, 2 & 4) was released in January  2011 (Mirare). More recently, Berezovsky released a recording of the Piano Concerto no. 2 by Tchaikovsky and other selected works (also with Mirare).

CDs
 A trio consisting of Boris Berezovsky, Dmitri Makhtin, Alexander Kniazev recorded a DVD of Tchaikovsky pieces for piano, violin and cello and Rachmaninoff's Trio élégiaque “A la mémoire d’un grand artiste” presented on ARTE TV Channel and NHK in Japan. They received for this DVD the 4 stars Diapason d'Or.
 For Warner Classics International Boris Berezovsky recorded with the same trio the Shostakovich Trio No. 2 and Rachmaninoff Trio élégiaque No. 2 which were awarded Choc de la Musique in France, Gramophone in England, ECHO Klassik and Deutsche Schallplattenkritik in Germany.
 His solo live recording Chopin/Godowsky Etudes was released in January 2006 and got several awards such as the Diapason d'Or, RTL d'Or and BBC Music Magazine.
 His album of Paul Hindemith Ludus Tonalis and Suite 1922 (Warner Classics) was awarded ECHO Klassik as the best solo recording of "Music of the 20th — 21st Century".

DVDs
 Boris Berezovsky — "Les Pianos de la Nuit". Liszt Transcendental Etudes, S. 139. Director: Andy Sommer. Filming: 4 August 2002 (Naïve 2003)
 Boris Berezovsky / Dmitri Makhtin / Alexander Kniazev — "Les Pianos De La Nuit". Tschaikovsky Seasons (No. 6); Nocturne in D minor, Op. 19, No. 4; Trio in A minor "A la mémoire d’un grand artiste", Op. 50; Serenade melancholique. Director: Andy Sommer. Filming: 10 August 2004 (Naïve 2006)
 Boris Berezovsky — "Change of Plans": Interview & Performance. Beethoven 33 Variationen C-Dur on Theme Antonio Diabelli, Op. 120; Medtner Tales, Op. 14, 20, 26, 34, 35, 48, 51; Llywelyn Improvisation on "Change of Plans"; Godovsky Altes Wien; Lyadov Preludes d-moll, Op. 40, No. 3 and G-Dur, Op. 46, No. 3, Bagatel As-Dur, Op. 53, No. 3. In: "Legato — The World Of Piano", Vol. 1. Director: Jan Schmidt-Garre. Filming: 14 July 2006 (Naxos 2007)

Awards
Berezovsky won the gold medal at the 1990 International Tchaikovsky Competition in Moscow.

References

External links 
 Biography from Warner Classics
 Michael Church about Boris Berezovsky for The Independent (1997)
 Peter Culshaw about Boris Berezovsky for Telegraph (2006)
 Mariko Kato about Boris Berezovsky for The Japan Times (2007)
 Productions Internationales Albert Sarfati: Boris Berezovsky

Russian classical pianists
Male classical pianists
Russian expatriates in the United Kingdom
Russian expatriates in Belgium
1969 births
Living people
Musicians from Moscow
Moscow Conservatory alumni
Prize-winners of the Leeds International Pianoforte Competition
Prize-winners of the International Tchaikovsky Competition
Erato Records artists